Mary Costello may refer to:
 Mary Costello (writer), Irish short story writer and novelist
 Mary Ann Costello, Irish actress
 Mary Costello (pastoralist), pastoralist in the Northern Territory of Australia